is a cover album by Japanese singer You Kikkawa. Released through Universal J on November 7, 2012, the album features covers of popular J-pop songs from the 1980s to the 2000s. The album cover features an anime-style caricature of Kikkawa. A limited edition release features a real picture of Kikkawa as the album cover and includes a DVD containing Miku Miku Dance (MMD) version music videos for "Koko kara Hajimarunda!" and "Darling to Madonna".

The album peaked at No. 40 on Oricon's albums chart.

Track listing

Charts

References

External links
 
 

2012 albums
Covers albums
Japanese-language albums
Universal Music Japan albums